Sphinga is a genus of flowering plants in the family Fabaceae. It belongs to the mimosoid clade of the subfamily Caesalpinioideae.

References

Mimosoids
Fabaceae genera
Taxa named by James Walter Grimes
Taxa named by Rupert Charles Barneby